Dendrobium amplum is a species of orchid native to Asia.

It is found in China, India in Assam and Sikkim, the eastern Himalayas, Nepal, Bhutan, Myanmar, Thailand, and Vietnam.

References

External links 
 
 

amplum
Orchids of Asia
Flora of East Himalaya
Flora of Indo-China
Orchids of Myanmar
Orchids of China
Orchids of India
Orchids of Nepal
Orchids of Thailand
Orchids of Vietnam